Lee Ho-eung (born 15 February 1978) is a South Korean short track speed skater.

At the 1998 Winter Olympics he won a silver medal in 5000 m relay, together with teammates Chae Ji-hoon, Lee Jun-hwan and Kim Dong-sung.

Education
Dankook University
Seoul Gwangmun High School

External links
Database Olympics

Lee Ho-eung at ISU

1978 births
Living people
South Korean male short track speed skaters
Short track speed skaters at the 1998 Winter Olympics
Olympic short track speed skaters of South Korea
Olympic silver medalists for South Korea
Dankook University alumni
Olympic medalists in short track speed skating
Medalists at the 1998 Winter Olympics
Asian Games medalists in short track speed skating
Short track speed skaters at the 1999 Asian Winter Games
Asian Games bronze medalists for South Korea
Medalists at the 1999 Asian Winter Games
20th-century South Korean people